Crystal Stilts EP is the first EP by the punk rock band Crystal Stilts. It was initially self-released in 2006 on the band's own Feathery Tongue label. In 2008 Woodsist re-released the EP and included the 2 songs from their first single, "Shattered Shine".

Track listing
 "Crippled Croon" – 4:22
 "The SinKing" – 2:42
 "Converging in the Quiet" – 4:21
 "Bright Night Nursery" – 3:25
 "Shattered Shine" – 4:08
 "Lights" – 4:14

Personnel
 Brad Hargett – vocals
 JB Townsend – music

References

2008 EPs
Crystal Stilts albums
Post-punk EPs
Noise pop EPs